Akçakoca Poyraz Gençlik ve Spor Kulubü is a Turkish basketball club based in Düzce . They are currently playing in the Turkish Second Basketball League.

League Positions
2006/07 - 1.(L3)
2007/08 - 6.(L2A)

Current squad 2007/08
last update May 10, 2008

Coach:  Cengiz Karadağ

References

External links
Official Akçakoca Poyraz site (Turkish)
2007-08 Stats

Düzce Province
Basketball teams in Turkey
Basketball teams established in 1976